The 2014 New England Revolution season was the club's nineteenth season of existence, and their nineteenth consecutive season in Major League Soccer, the top flight of American soccer.

Background

Review

Major League Soccer

March 

New England Revolution started the season against the Houston Dynamo on March 8. Houston won 4–0 with goals from Will Bruin (2 goals), Óscar Boniek García, and Omar Cummings scored for Houston. Bobby Shuttleworth denied Bruin and Cummings an extra goal each after a breakaway. New England faced Philadelphia Union on March 15. Philadelphia won 1–0 with a goal from Sébastien Le Toux. New England made five changes to their lineup from the previous week. The Revs began their home slate for the 2014 season with a 0–0 against the Vancouver Whitecaps FC. They went back on the road to grab their first win on the season against the San Jose Earthquakes. The Revs got an own goal from the Earthquakes and Lee Nguyen potted the winner late in stoppage time to pull out a 2–1 victory.

April 

New England began April with a poor effort in a 2–0 loss to D.C. United on the road. However, they bounced back to earn a 2–0 victory at home against the Houston Dynamo on the first goal of Kevin Alston's career and a late Jerry Bengtson insurance goal.  The Revs then earned a fantastic 1–1 draw at the Chicago Fire because of goalkeeper Bobby Shuttleworth's penalty kick save late in the game. New England then put in a fantastic effort to take down defending MLS Cup champions Sporting Kansas City where Teal Bunbury scored his first goal for New England 2 minutes into stoppage time and Lee Nguyen added a late penalty kick goal to give the Revs the 2–0 win.

May 

The Revs began May the same way they finished April with a strong effort in a 2–1 win at Toronto FC. Rookie Patrick Mullins showed off his useful left foot with a long, driven strike to pull the Revs even and Lee Nguyen finished it off with another wonder goal from a penalty. Looking to continue their recent good form, New England welcomed the Seattle Sounders FC with a monster showing drubbing the league leading Sounders with flurry of goals winning their 3rd straight with a 5–0 result. Diego Fagundez finally got on the scorers sheet with a double helping the Revs to victory. New England followed up that result with another impressive offensive showing in a 5–3 win over the Philadelphia Union, becoming just the third team in MLS history to score five goals in back-to-back games. The Revs spread the wealth in the attack with five different players scoring the five goals. A.J. Soares and Chris Tierney each scored their first goals of the year while Diego Fagundez, Patrick Mullins and Lee Nguyen continued their fantastic form to help the Revs to victory.

U.S. Open Cup 

On Friday, May 16, 2014, it was announced that the New England Revolution would face the winner of the game between the Richmond Kickers and the Greek American AA. The Revolution ended up playing the Kickers and won the game 3–2 on the strength of 3 first half goals. New England advanced to play their USL affiliate the Rochester Rhinos and ended up downing them with another pair of goals early in the game. In the quarterfinals the Revolution were matched up against the Philadelphia Union and were put down rather easily with a 2–0 result in the Union's favor ending New England's chances at winning the U.S. Open Cup.

Squad

Roster 

As of May 19, 2014. Source: New England Revolution Roster

Technical staff

Player movement

In 

Per Major League Soccer and club policies terms of the deals do not get disclosed.

Out

Loans

In

Out

Matches and results

MLS regular season

MLS Cup Playoffs

U.S. Open Cup

Tables

Eastern Conference

Overall table

Results summary

Results

Player information

Outfield player statistics

Goalkeeper statistics

Recognition

Leading scorers 

Updated to end of regular season.Source: - 2014 New England Revolution

MLS Team of the Week

MLS Player of the Week

Kits

See also 

 New England Revolution
 2014 in American soccer
 2014 Major League Soccer season

References 

New England Revolution seasons
New England Revolution
New England Revolution
New England Revolution
Sports competitions in Foxborough, Massachusetts